The Bridges of Madison County is a 1995 American romantic drama film based on the 1992 bestselling novel of the same name by Robert James Waller. It was produced and directed by Clint Eastwood, who also starred in it with Meryl Streep. The screenplay was adapted by Richard LaGravenese. Kathleen Kennedy was co-producer.  It was produced by Amblin Entertainment and Malpaso Productions, and distributed by Warner Bros. Entertainment.

The film is set in 1965, featuring Italian war bride, Francesca Johnson (Meryl Streep), who lives with her husband and two children on their Iowa farm. That year she meets National Geographic photojournalist, Robert Kincaid (Clint Eastwood), who comes to Madison County to photograph its historic covered bridges. With Francesca's family away for a short trip, the couple have an intense, four-day love affair. The film earned $182 million worldwide and was well-received by critics. Streep was nominated in 1996 for an Academy Award for Best Actress for her performance.

Plot
In the present, adult siblings Michael and Carolyn Johnson arrive at the Iowa farmhouse of their recently deceased mother, Francesca, to settle her estate. They are shocked upon learning that Francesca requested to be cremated and her ashes scattered from Roseman Covered Bridge, rather than be buried next to her late husband, Richard.

Michael initially refuses, but while he and Carolyn look through the safe deposit box, they discover an envelope containing photographs, letters, and a key. The photos are of Francesca taken at the Holliwell Covered Bridge and the letters are from a man named Robert Kincaid. The key is to Francesca's locked hope chest. In it are three hardbound notebooks. There are also several National Geographic magazines, including one featuring Madison County's covered wooden bridges, old cameras, a book, and other mementos. The magazine includes a photo of Kincaid, who photographed the bridges; he is wearing Francesca's crucifix pendant.

As Michael and Carolyn begin reading Francesca's notebooks, the film flashes back to 1965. Francesca, a WWII Italian war bride, stays home while her husband and teenaged son and daughter attend the state fair for the next four days. Robert Kincaid, a National Geographic photojournalist on assignment to photograph the county's historic bridges, arrives at the Johnson farm, asking for directions to Roseman Bridge. Francesca rides along to show him the way. Their subsequent affair occurs over four days.

Francesca details the intense affair and its lasting influence on both her and Robert, hoping Michael and Carolyn will understand and honor her final request. Francesca and Robert fell deeply in love and nearly ran away together. Francesca, confined to a passionless marriage, was unable to abandon her teenage children and loyal husband. Though she loved Robert, she questioned whether their spontaneous relationship could survive over time. Robert, moved by their brief encounter, found renewed meaning in his life and true calling as an artist. Francesca's memories helped sustain her through the remaining years on the farm.

After her husband's death, Francesca attempted to contact Robert, but he had left National Geographic and his whereabouts were unknown. She later learned that Robert died about three years after her husband, and he left his belongings to her. His ashes were scattered from Roseman Bridge.

In the present, Michael and Carolyn, struggling with their own marriages, are deeply moved by their mother's story. They find new direction to their individual lives and carry out their mother's wishes to scatter her ashes at Roseman Bridge.

Cast
 Clint Eastwood as Robert Kincaid
 Meryl Streep as Francesca Johnson
 Annie Corley as Carolyn Johnson
 Sarah Kathryn Schmitt as young Carolyn
 Victor Slezak as Michael Johnson
 Christopher Kroon as young Michael
 Jim Haynie as Richard Johnson
 Phyllis Lyons as Betty
 Debra Monk as Madge
 Richard Lage as Lawyer Peterson
 Michelle Benes as Lucy Redfield

Production

Development

Amblin Entertainment, a production company founded by Steven Spielberg, bought the film rights to Waller's novel for $25,000 in late 1991, before its publication—by the time of the film's release, the novel sold 9.5 million copies worldwide. Spielberg first asked Sydney Pollack to direct, who got Kurt Luedtke to draft the first version of the adaptation but then bowed out; Ronald Bass was brought in by Kathleen Kennedy and Spielberg to work on the script, but they were unsatisfied with the results. But a third draft by Richard LaGravenese was liked by Eastwood, who quite early had been cast for the male lead, and by Spielberg, who liked LaGravenese's version enough to consider making Bridges his next film after Schindler's List, which was in post-production at the time.  Both men liked that LaGravenese's script presented the story from Francesca's point of view; Spielberg then had LaGravenese introduce the framing device of having Francesca's adult children discover and read her diaries. When Spielberg decided not to direct, he then brought in Bruce Beresford, who got Alfred Uhry to draft another version of the script; when Warner Bros., Spielberg, and Eastwood all preferred LaGravenese's draft, Beresford dropped out.

Waller championed Isabella Rossellini to play Francesca; she was a "strong contender" in a list that also included Anjelica Huston, Jessica Lange, Mary McDonnell, Cher, and Susan Sarandon. But despite Spielberg's initial reluctance, Eastwood had advocated Meryl Streep for the role from the beginning.

Filming

Principal photography took 42 days, ending on November 1, 1994, ten days ahead of Eastwood's 52-day schedule; Eastwood filmed it chronologically from Francesca's point of view, "because it was important to work that way. We were two people getting to know each other, in real time, as actors and as the characters." It was filmed on location in Madison County, Iowa, including the town of Winterset, and in the Dallas County town of Adel.

Post-production
The MPAA ratings board initially gave the film an "R" rating, for the line "Or should we just fuck on the linoleum one last time?", a line of dialogue spoken sarcastically by Francesca; Eastwood appealed, and the rating was reduced to a PG-13.

Release

Box office
The Bridges of Madison County opened theatrically on June 2, 1995, in 1,805 venues. It grossed $10,519,257 in its opening weekend, ranking number two at the US box office, behind Casper (which was in its second weekend and coincidentally features Eastwood in a cameo). It was number one at the Japanese box office for nine consecutive weeks, grossing over $35 million. At the end of its run, the film grossed $71,516,617 in the United States and Canada and $110,500,000 overseas for a worldwide total of $182,016,617.

Critical reception
On Rotten Tomatoes, the film has a score of 90% based on 60 reviews, with an average rating of 7.40/10. The site's consensus states: "Sentimental, slow, schmaltzy, and very satisfying, The Bridges of Madison County finds Clint Eastwood adapting a bestseller with heft, wit, and grace." On Metacritic, the film has a 69 out of 100 rating, based on 23 critics, indicating "generally favorable reviews". Audiences surveyed by CinemaScore gave the film a grade "A−" on scale of A+ to F.

According to Janet Maslin, "Clint Eastwood, director and alchemist, has transformed The Bridges of Madison County into something bearable—no, something even better. Limited by the vapidity of this material while he trims its excesses with the requisite machete, Mr. Eastwood locates a moving, elegiac love story at the heart of Mr. Waller's self-congratulatory overkill. The movie has leanness and surprising decency, and Meryl Streep has her best role in years. Looking sturdy and voluptuous in her plain housedress (the year is 1965), Ms. Streep rises straight out of Christina's World to embody all the loneliness and fierce yearning Andrew Wyeth captured on canvas. And yet, despite the Iowa setting and the emphasis on down-home Americana, Mr. Eastwood's Bridges of Madison County has a European flavor. Its pace is unhurried, which is not the same as slow. It respects long silences and pays attention to small details. It sustains an austere tone and staves off weepiness until the last reel. It voices musings that would definitely sound better in French." Richard Corliss said Eastwood is the "most reticent of directors—where the book ogles, the film discreetly observes—and, here, the courtliest of stars....As scripted by Richard LaGravenese (The Fisher King), the Madison County movie has a slightly riper theme than the book's. It is about the anticipation and consequences of passion—the slow dance of appraisal, of waiting to make a move that won't be rejected, of debating what to do when the erotic heat matures into love light. What is the effect of an affair on a woman who has been faithful to her husband, and on a rootless man who only now realizes he needs the one woman he can have but not hold?"  Corliss concludes "Madison County is Eastwood's gift to women: to Francesca, to all the girls he's loved before—and to Streep, who alchemizes literary mawkishness into intelligent movie passion."

Accolades

Others
The film tied with Goodbye South, Goodbye and Carlito's Way as the best film of the 1990s in a poll by Cahiers du cinéma.

The film is recognized by American Film Institute in these lists:
 2002: AFI's 100 Years...100 Passions – #90
 2004: AFI's 100 Years...100 Songs:
 "I See Your Face Before Me" – Nominated

References

External links
 
 
 
 

1995 films
1995 romantic drama films
Adultery in films
Amblin Entertainment films
American romantic drama films
1990s English-language films
Films about photographers
Films based on American novels
Films based on romance novels
Films directed by Clint Eastwood
Films produced by Clint Eastwood
Films produced by Kathleen Kennedy
Films set in 1965
Films set in Iowa
Films shot in Iowa
Films shot in Pennsylvania
Malpaso Productions films
Warner Bros. films
Films scored by Lennie Niehaus
Films about bridges
1990s American films